Weltenkraft is the debut album of the German folk metal band Finsterforst.

Track listing

Personnel

 Band members
 Marco Schomas - vocals and twelve-string guitar
 Tobias Weinreich - bass
 Johannes Joseph - accordion and vocals
 Simon Schillinger - guitar and vocals
 Cornelius "Wombo" Heck - drums and vocals
 AlleyJazz - keyboards and vocals
 David Schuldis - guitar

 Guest musicians
 Christoph Schuster - oboe
 Sevan Kirder - tin whistle, German flute and vocals
 Jonas Mayer - vocals

References

Encyclopaedia Metallum
Metal Storm

2007 debut albums
Finsterforst albums